Gunilla Sonja Eva Axén (born 27 October 1966) is a Swedish former footballer. She played as a striker for Gideonsbergs IF and the Sweden women's national football team. Axén is employed as a development manager for the Swedish Football Association (SvFF).

Club career 

In 1986 Axén won the Årets Fotbollstjej award, the forerunner of the Diamantbollen. That season she had also been the Swedish League's top goal-scorer with 22 goals.

In 1989 an anterior cruciate ligament injury sustained on the artificial turf at Tipshallen in Jönköping ended Axén's playing career early. She had reportedly been attracting interest from professional clubs in the Italian Serie A.

International career 

Axén made her senior Sweden debut in the semi final of the 1984 European Competition for Women's Football, against Italy in Linköping. Sweden won 2–1 after two goals by Pia Sundhage. Axén was included in the squad who defeated England in the final.

In the semi-final of the 1987 European Competition for Women's Football in Moss, substitute Axén scored twice against England as Sweden won 3–2 after extra time. At the 1988 FIFA Women's Invitation Tournament in Guangdong she was part of the Swedish squad who finished runners-up to Norway.

Personal life 

Axén is married to Anders Wengrud, who was also a footballer and football coach. She has a son named Pontus. In 2003 Axén was appointed to a senior development role in the Swedish Football Association (SvFF).

References 

Living people
1966 births
Swedish women's footballers
Sweden women's international footballers
Damallsvenskan players
UEFA Women's Championship-winning players
Women's association football forwards
People from Eskilstuna
Sportspeople from Södermanland County
Gideonsbergs IF players